Tokyo Institute of Technology Library is the largest science and technology library in Japan. The library was founded in 1882 as part of the Tokyo Vocational School, and at the time had nearly 4700 books. In the following year, expansion legislation was passed on behalf of the library, and it grew to over 457,000 m2 by 1902.

A year later the library lost nearly 28,000 books to the Great Kantō earthquake in 1923. It was rebuilt in Ookayama, Meguro, making its size 862 m2. At the founding of the Tokyo Institute of Technology in 1929, the library was legally recognised. Following World War II in 1948, a library committee was formed. During the 1970s a second building was constructed for the library in Nagatsuta.

In 1986, just two years after the first PCs had been popularized, the library began a system of online journal searches with LAN. Its online journal started in 1995. Four years later, Tokyo Institute of Technology digital library (TDL) was introduced. In 2002, the library began its GIF projects, while in 2007, the library began a T2R2 system. A new library building was constructed in 2011.

The library remains extensive. It currently subscribes to approximately 19,000 books and 3,300 journals, while maintaining a collection of over 793,000 books and 16,000 journals. In addition, as of 2010, the Tokyo Institute Library included 10,000 online journals.

References

Library buildings completed in 1924
Tokyo Institute of Technology
Libraries in Tokyo
Academic libraries in Japan
Libraries established in 1882